"Le chant des sirènes" is a song by Fréro Delavega from the album Fréro Delavega.

Charts

Weekly charts

Year-end charts

References

2015 singles
2015 songs
French-language songs